The St. Petersburg League of Struggle for the Emancipation of the Working Class (Sojuz borʹby za osvobozhdenie rabochego klassa, known sometimes in English by the initials SBORK) was a Marxist group in the Russian Empire. It was founded in St. Petersburg by Vladimir Lenin, Julius Martov, Gleb Krzhizhanovsky, Anatoly Vaneyev, Alexander Malchenko, P. Zaporozhets and V. Starkov in the autumn of 1895. It united twenty different Marxist study circles, but Lenin dominated the league through the 'central group'. Its main activity was agitation amongst the workers of St Petersburg and the distribution of socialist leaflets to the factories there.

Towards the end of 1895, the League had prepared the first issue of their new newspaper, Rabocheye Delo; it was ready to go to press when it was seized by the gendarmes during a raid on the house of Vaneyev, on December 20. Six League members were arrested, Lenin among them. When the news spread among the workers of the Shlisselburg Highway that the discovery and arrest were facilitated by an agent provocateur, N. N. Mikhailov, a dentist who had been in contact with a group associated with members of the League, the workers were so enraged that they decided to kill him.

While in prison, Lenin continued to guide the work of the League. In 1896 several more, including Martov, were arrested. Those members of the group still at large however scored a great success organising a strike of the textile workers in St Petersburg in May 1896. This industrial action lasted three weeks and spread to twenty other factories in Russia in what became the greatest strike in Russian history up to that date.

In 1897, the League created Sankt-Peterburgskiy Rabochiy Listok (Saint Petersburg Workers' Paper). It only published two numbers, on February and on September.

By the end of the 1890s the League was transporting its illegal literature through Finland and Stockholm. Transportation was organised by Hjalmar Branting, a Swedish Social-Democrat, Carder, a Norwegian Social-Democrat, and A. Weidel, a Swedish worker who settled in Finland for that purpose. But Garder's arrest in 1900 disrupted the arrangement and the route via Finland. A route running from Stockholm to Åbo and across the Russian frontier was restarted in 1901. The group's organization contributed to the founding of the Russian Social Democratic Labor Party in 1898. Lenin went on to become the leader of the Bolshevik faction of the party, while Martov became leader of the Menshevik faction, after the 2nd Congress of the Russian Social Democratic Labor Party in 1903.

Alexander Malchenko abandoned revolutionary politics after returning from exile in 1900. He was later arrested in 1929 as a counter-revolutionary and shot in 1930. Afterwards his image was airbrushed out of an 1897 photo of the seven leaders of the League until his posthumous rehabilitation in 1958.

With Lenin imprisoned, the League (and Rabocheye Delo) fell under the control of the Economists (Marxists who wanted the workers to stick to economic demands only, with no political demands) through their paper Rabochaya Mysl (Workers' Thought), published 1897–1902. In the autumn of 1900, the League merged with the St. Petersburg Workers' Organisation.

See also 
 Emancipation of Labour

References

External links
Marxists.org

Communist organizations in Russia
Defunct organizations based in Russia
Political parties established in 1895
Russian Social Democratic Labour Party
1895 establishments in the Russian Empire
Political parties disestablished in 1900
1900 disestablishments in Europe